Harry Forbes was an American cinematographer whose career spanned the silent and sound eras.  His first film was 1915's The Victory of Virtue, billed as Harry W. Forbes.  

Forbes died on August 17, 1939, shortly after the release of the final film he worked on, Death Goes North.

Selected filmography
 Little Miss Nobody (1917)
 The Little Terror (1917)
 Beggar's Holiday (1934)
Marrying Widows  (1934)   
 Million Dollar Haul (1935)

References

External links

American cinematographers
1888 births
1939 deaths